The Le Redoutable-class submarine was a ballistic missile submarine class of the French Navy (Marine Nationale). In French, the type is called  Sous-marin Nucléaire Lanceur d'Engins (SNLE), literally "Missile-launching nuclear submarine". When commissioned, they constituted the strategic part of the naval component of the French nuclear triad, then called Force de frappe (the aircraft carriers  and  constituting the tactical part).

All have since been decommissioned. The structural changes in Inflexible have seen it regarded as a different class from the early boats.

Background
With the election of Charles de Gaulle as president of France, the French Armed Forces saw a change in direction. Under the new government, French forces were withdrawn from NATO formations due to French unhappiness with American domination of the group. Beginning in the 1960s, French foreign policy would be reshaped to create independence from both of the major opponents of the Cold War, the United States and the Soviet Union. This was later defined in the mantra "to deter – to intervene – to defend". From the foreign policy arose the concept of submarine-based "Force de Dissuassion", with emphasis on the "to deter", which was the focus of new French naval spending.

The new nuclear-powered, nuclear-armed submarine force was planned to be of similar size to the British Royal Navy. However, unlike the British, the French received no support from other nations and the French nuclear program began with a lack of technological expertise to draw from. Furthermore, the Americans refused to provide the French Navy with enriched uranium for the creation of a nuclear reactor. Nevertheless, the project was authorized in 1963. The French Navy resorted to working in conjunction with the civil French Alternative Energies and Atomic Energy Commission (French: Commissariat à l'énergie atomique et aux énergies alternatives), which the US allowed to acquire enriched uranium for experimental land use. A nuclear plant was constructed on land at Cadarache and the reactor was tested to simulate nuclear-powered submarine patrols. Other developments made by the groups working on the project include the development of high-tensile steel by France and the adaption of the submarine hull to nuclear propulsion.

At the same time as the French were developing nuclear propulsion, they were also researching ballistic missiles and nuclear warheads. Caissons were constructed to test fire missiles and by 1967, the submarine  was fitted with the guidance and navigation systems to be tested. The first ballistic missile launch was at the Landes Trials Centre (French: Centre d'Essais des Landes) at the end of 1968 and nuclear warheads were tested at Moruroa in the Pacific Ocean.

Description

The submarines initially displaced  surfaced and  submerged. This later increased to  surfaced. The submarines were powered by one pressurised water reactor providing steam to two turbines and two alternators and turning one propeller via a turbo reduction drive creating . Each boat had two twin crews comprising 15 officers and 120 men.

Armament
The Redoutable class all have 16 compartments for submarine-launched ballistic missiles. Redoutable initially deployed with 16 the M1 MSBS (Mer-Sol Balistique Stratégique). The M1 had a 400-kiloton warhead and an approximate  range. Terrible was also constructed to carry this missile. The design of Foudroyant was altered to carry the improved M2 MSBS missile in 1974. In 1977, both the M1 and M2 were replaced by the M20 MSBS.

Vessels in class

Service history
The first submarine, Redoutable, was ordered in 1963, built at Cherbourg, launched in 1967 and commissioned in 1971. This was replaced by the M2 MSBS beginning in 1974, which was in turn replaced by the M20 MSBS beginning in 1977. All except Redoutable were heavily upgraded from 1985 to fire the second generation MIRV capable M4 missile – Tonnant was recommissioned in 1987; Indomptable in 1989; Terrible in 1990; and Foudroyant in 1993.

Redoutable has been preserved since 2002 as a museum ship at the Cité de la Mer naval museum in Cherbourg-Octeville, France. The reactor compartment has been replaced by a new section.

See also 
 List of submarines of France

Citations and references

Citations

References
 
 
 
 

Submarine classes
 
Cold War submarines of France
Ship classes of the French Navy